Sannantha pluriflora, commonly known as tall baeckea, is a flowering shrub or small tree species in the myrtle family, Myrtaceae. It is endemic to Australia. Plants grow to 4 metres high. White flowers appear in groups of three to seven between October and April in the species' native range. These have five rounded petals surrounding 8–15 stamens.

Taxonomy
The species was first formally described in 1855 by Victorian Government Botanist Ferdinand von Mueller and given the name Camphoromyrtus pluriflora. It was placed in the genus Babingtonia in 1997 and in 2007 it was placed in the newly created genus Sannantha. For many years the name Baeckea virgata was misapplied to this species. Baeckea virgata, currently Sannantha virgata, is endemic to New Caledonia.

Distribution
The species occurs from Gippsland in Victoria and northwards to Port Stephens in New South Wales.

Cultivation
The species has been cultivated for many years under various names. Cultivars include:
'Clarence River'
'Golden'
'La Petite'
'White Cascade'

References

Flora of New South Wales
Flora of Victoria (Australia)
plurifolia
Myrtales of Australia
Taxa named by Ferdinand von Mueller